Salomon James de Rothschild (1835–1864) was a French banker and socialite.

Biography

Early life
Salomon James de Rothschild was born on 30 March 1835. His father was James Mayer de Rothschild, head of the Paris branch of the prominent Rothschild family of bankers.

Career
As a young man, according to the Goncourt brothers, he squandered "a million on the stock exchange in attempted secrecy from his father" and was exiled to Frankfurt, where he spent two years keeping books. After this, his father wrote to him, "Mr. Salomon's affair is not terminated." Rothschild was dispatched to America, where he was supposed to help advance the family's banking interests.

From 1859 to 1861, he traveled extensively in the United States, Canada and Cuba. He was an eyewitness to the events leading up to the American Civil War. He regarded Abraham Lincoln as an extremist and his political sympathies lay with the Confederate cause. In letters to his family, he described in vivid terms the social customs and notable events of the day, including the visit of the future King Edward VII, the high wire act of Charles Blondin, the arrival of the first official Japanese embassy to the United States, and the maiden voyage of the SS Great Eastern.

As a representative of the world's most prominent banking family, he traveled with a ten-person retinue and mingled with high society wherever he went, always taking note of beautiful and well-dressed women along the way. The lawyer George Templeton Strong, met Salomon and described him thus: "the Baron, though illustrious and a millionnaire, was immoderately given to lewd talk and nude photographs." His English cousin Constance, daughter of Anthony de Rothschild, described him as "brilliantly gifted but less addicted to steady work and habits of business than his brothers...genial, brilliant, somewhat dare-devil."

Personal life

Salomon married  (1843–1922), daughter of his cousin Mayer Carl von Rothschild. Their daughter Hélène de Rothschild became the Baroness Hélène van Zuylen van Nijevelt de Haar, after her marriage to the Dutchborn Roman Catholic Baron Étienne van Zuylen van Nyevelt van de Haar (1860–1934) of the House of Van Zuylen van Nijevelt.

Death
He died in Paris on 14 May 1864 at the age of 29, only two years after his marriage and less than a year after the birth of his daughter, Helene (1863–1947). He was buried at Pere Lachaise Cemetery in the family vault. Of his death, the Goncourt brothers wrote "Cabarrus, the Rothschild's doctor, told Saint-Victor that the young Rothschild who died the other day really died of the excitement of gambling on the stock exchange."

References

1835 births
1864 deaths
Salomon James
Burials at Père Lachaise Cemetery
19th-century French Jews
French bankers
French socialites
19th-century French businesspeople